Martin Günther (born 8 October 1986) is a German high jumper.

He won the 2003 World Youth Championships and finished eighth at the 2010 World Indoor Championships.

His personal best jump is 2.30 metres, achieved in February 2010 (indoor) in Karlsruhe.

References

1986 births
Living people
German male high jumpers
Place of birth missing (living people)